The Ballad of Desmond Kale is a Miles Franklin Award-winning novel by Australian author Roger McDonald.

Dedication

For Lorna McDonald
with love and thanks
for gifts of conversation, friendship, and example
over a lifetime

External links
Reviews
"The Age"
"The Sydney Morning Herald"

2005 Australian novels
Miles Franklin Award-winning works